Ahmad Matin-Daftari, also known as Mo'in al-Dowleh, (23 January 1897 – 26 June 1971) was an Iranian politician. He served as the former Prime Minister of Pahlavi Iran from 1939 until 1940.

Biography
Ahmad Matin-Daftari was born on 23 January 1897 in Tehran to father Mirza Mahmud-Khan Ain ul-Mamalek. He studied in Tehran's German School and received his Ph.D. in France. He wrote his dissertation in 1929.

Matin-Daftari served as Senator in Iran's Majlis and became Prime Minister on 26 October 1939 with the fall of Mahmoud Jam's administration. During his premiership, the first National census was implemented in Iran and Iran's first National Radio transmitter was inaugurated. Matin Daftari was removed from the office on 25 June 1940.

Matin-Daftari was thrown in prison after the Anglo-Soviet invasion of Iran by the Allies in 1941 because of his German connections.

He was Mohammad Mosaddegh's nephew and son-in-law. His daughter was painter Leyly Matine-Daftary; his son was lawyer and leader of the National Democratic Front political party, .

Matin-Daftari died in Tehran at the age of 74.

See also
 Pahlavi dynasty
 Abdolhossein Teymourtash

Bibliography
'Alí Rizā Awsatí (عليرضا اوسطى), Iran in the Past Three Centuries (Irān dar Se Qarn-e Goz̲ashteh - ايران در سه قرن گذشته), Volumes 1 and 2 (Paktāb Publishing - انتشارات پاکتاب, Tehran, Iran, 2003).  (Vol. 1),  (Vol. 2).

References

External links

Prime Ministers of Iran
Politicians from Tehran
1897 births
1971 deaths
Iranian monarchists
Members of the Academy of Persian Language and Literature
20th-century Iranian politicians
Mostowfian Ashtiani family
Members of the International Law Commission